The Family Rosary Crusade is a multi-media based ministry in the Philippines. In the 1950s, Reverend Father Fr. Patrick Peyton, CSC came to the Philippines upon the invitation of the Dominican Fathers, or Order of Preachers, to conduct and speak on his worldwide efforts to promote the praying of the Family Rosary all over the world. Father Peyton was warmly welcomed in the Philippines and from thereon, his mission has grown and expanded all over the country. Father Peyton died in 1992, but his mission in the Philippines continues to date with programs airing in various radio and television networks.

History

Distant collaborations
The promotion of the Family Rosary through the use of mass media was intensely pursued by Father Peyton in the United States in the late 1940s, viewed by many as an important step of healing families whose loved ones were lost in the intense fighting during the Second World War. In 1947, Father Peyton with the volunteer help from Hollywood's named stars, dramatizations of family life centered on praying the Rosary were being aired on the United States radio network, Mutual Broadcasting System.

In 1947, a Jesuit priest, Rev. Father James B. Reuter, SJ who was in the United States submitted a radio drama play to Father Peyton and was used on the "Family Theater" programs that was aired on Mutual Broadcasting System. Father Reuter, a priest who was assigned to the Philippines before the Second World War and was among those severely treated while in Japanese prison camp returned to Manila in 1948.

Father Reuter launched a Philippine version of the "Family Theater" on radio station KZPI (now known as DWIZ) with named Filipino actors and actresses voicing the radio drama scripts that Father Peyton used in the United States. The program would air every Sunday evening when every family member was at home.

With the advent of television in the Philippines, "Family Theater" on television were among the first programs that aired on the country's first television station, DZAQ owned by the Alto Broadcasting System, co-owned by a retired American war veteran communications engineer James Lindenberg and Antonio Quirino, brother of the incumbent Philippine president of that time, Elpidio Quirino.

Father Peyton first got to visit the Philippines in 1953, a few years since his mission was introduced to the Philippines by Father Reuter, his efforts to promote the praying of the Family Rosary have started to take roots in the Philippines and by the time he even started some of his famous Rosary rallies in the country, Father Peyton was already a household name in radio and television.

In the 1960s, Eugenio Lopez's Chronicle Broadcasting Network (CBN) acquired Alto Broadcasting System to establish what would be the most important television network in the Philippines all throughout the 1960s. ABS-CBN brought in "Family Theater" into its prime time programming in the 1960s.

Named Filipino actors and actresses including unknown ones who would later become entertainment icons worked with Father Reuter's "Family Theater" productions for free. At first "Family Theater" was airing for free on Channel 3 (later Channel 2 in 1969) of ABS-CBN but later the group was asked to bring advertising into the network, and when the call was made, people continued to donate to keep the program airing.

Filipino named celebrities Vic Diaz, Celia Diaz-Laurel, Barbara Perez, Vic Silayan, Pancho Magalona, Tita Duran, Jaime Zobel de Ayala, Zenaida Amador, Baby Barredo, Noel Trinidad, Subas Herrero, Robert Arevalo, Cristina Ponce-Enrile, Patsy Monzon were among those who appeared on Family Theater. Jaime Zobel de Ayala would later become chairman of a Filipino banking, real estate and telecommunications holding company, Ayala group. Zeneida Amador and Baby Barredo would later establish the country's highly respected theater group, Repertory Philippines.

The Blanket of Darkness

In 1972, Former President Ferdinand Marcos declared Martial Law and all forms of media were silenced. ABS-CBN was shut down under the Marcos regime and all "Family Theater" programs both on television and radio ceased to broadcast.

On December 8, 1985, Father Peyton led a very successful Marian Rally at Rizal Park. Amidst the political turmoil affecting the country at that time, the call to prayer and world peace brought more than a million Filipinos before the Quirino Grandstand. The rally, with the support of Cardinal Jaime Sin, consecrated the Philippines to the Immaculate Heart of Mary. Filipinos were incensed with prayers and strengthened faith, later to serve as the inspiration to peacefully overthrow the Marcos dictatorship two months later.

In 1985, months before the Marian Rally, Father Peyton would kindly seek permission to promote the scheduled rally on various media outlets in the Philippines who were all subject to censorship or were under the control of Marcos cronies. Father Peyton would finally appear on the government television station, Maharlika Broadcasting System Channel 4 for a series of talks on the Marian Rally and the importance of prayers. This television appearance would later result in the newer incarnation of Father Peyton's mission in Philippine broadcast history a year later.

With the peaceful overthrow of Marcos in 1986, with a renewed faith spreading like wildfire in the Philippines, seeing millions of Filipinos muzzling the guns of soldiers loyal to Marcos by flowers and Rosaries and with a new president, Corazon Aquino leading a nation in praying the Rosary, the mission of Father Peyton started to bloom again in the Philippines. When ABS-CBN reopened after six months, Father Reuter revived "Family Theater" under a new title "Ang Pamilya Ko," (My Family) but it would only run on ABS-CBN for thirteen weeks until it was canceled.

From drama to magazine talk show
With democracy restored in the Philippines and there was an intense feel of faith in the air, Father Peyton saw the possibilities of developing a different type of program for the Philippines. After the poor reception to the timely wholesome family-centered drama program "Ang Pamilya Ko" on ABS-CBN, Father Peyton started launching his one-hour once a week magazine talk show program.

"Family Rosary Crusade," was premiered on March 7, 1987, for the relaunch of ABS-CBN as The Star Network (now Kapamilya Network).

Every Saturday morning, Father Peyton would be on ABS-CBN to start the program with the praying of the Rosary. He would be later joined by a long-time advertising practitioner, Rosita "Babs" Hontiveros or "Tita Babs" (Auntie Babs) as the co-host. For almost five years, the program continued to air until the death of Father Peyton in June 1992.

FRC after the death of Father Peyton
Despite the death of Father Peyton in 1992, the weekly television program "Family Rosary Crusade," continues to air on ABS-CBN with Babs Hontiveros as main host with Father James Reuter, SJ. Behind the scenes, a group of media volunteers continue to lend a hand in continuing with the mission of Father Peyton, utilizing mass media as a handy tool for evangelization and the promotion of the praying of the Family Rosary.

Family Rosary Crusade was being run by Gennie Q. Jota who served as Executive Director and ably recruited volunteers to write, contribute almost anything to keep the program running. Veteran sound engineer, Beda Orquejo who was met by Father Peyton at the old government television network under Marcos' time left his regular work with the network to serve as all-around technical person. Orquejo would serve as director, cameraman and editor of the weekly episodes of Family Rosary Crusade.

Several television networks also sought programs of Family Rosary Crusade, aired for with free airtime and without advertisements. From 1992 up to 2002, Family Rosary Crusade had almost 40 hours of free airtime to fill for television networks like People's Television (PTV), Radio Philippines Network (RPN), Associated Broadcasting Company (ABC), Rajah Broadcasting (RJTV). Family Rosary Crusade's locally produced programs and a library of films produced by Family Theater in the United States aired throughout this period.

In 1992, the Associated Broadcasting Company (ABC) resumed its broadcast operations after it was shut down by martial law in 1972. The television network became a semi-official carrier for Family Rosary Crusade. The network utilized as part of its station identification at the top of every hour a plug wherein the Blessed Virgin Mary speaking before Filipinos appealing to pray the Rosary and with the closing standard slogan, "The family that prays together stays together." The plug ran on ABC from the reopening to the relaunching as Iba Tayo in 2004 after businessman Tonyboy Cojuangco purchased the network.

With more airtime, means more original programs to produce and this called in for more volunteers.

Mrs. Jota and Beda Orquejo recruited several personalities to appear on Family Rosary Crusade. Dominican priest Father Larry Faraon, OP joined Family Rosary Crusade as a younger voice for inspiration for the younger audience. Younger hosts would join Father Larry, Loudette Zaragosa Banson who appeared on Father Reuter's drama programs will be joined by radio drama personality Bernard Factor-Cañaberal as the two main hosts of the magazine talk show Family Rosary Crusade. Inspirational motivator Claudine Zialcita would later join the three other hosts to become the news reader for a segment called, "Religious Update."

Father James Reuter, SJ will have his own daily program on ABC called, "Three Minutes a Day" that aired at 3:00 pm for three minutes. Father Reuter would reflect on the day's Gospel reading.

When ABS-CBN launched a sister station Studio 23 in 1996, the program aired in every weekday morning for 30 minutes just before the simulcast of MTV Asia and later Myx. ABS-CBN's flagship Channel 2 would continue to air it until 2003 when Studio 23 continues to air the program, airing at 7:00 am every Sunday. The program continues with its magazine type programming with talks and discussions related to themes of the Catholic Church with sole host Bernard Cañaberal and supported by Claudine Zialcita, Ces Datu and guest priest Gospel homilist.

In March 2010, Family Rosary Crusade gets a new National Director, a member of the Congregation of Holy Cross from the South Asia province, Reverend Father Roque D'Acosta, CSC, formerly a Spiritual Director for the FRC for two years. The Family Rosary Crusade also left its 50-year office in Pope Pius XII Catholic Center in the Archdiocese of Manila and moved to a formation house/television studio in Loyola Heights, Quezon City within the recently created Diocese of Cubao. The new office serves as its studios and production facilities and formation house for future members of the mission of the Congregation of Holy Cross in the Philippines.

On January 19, 2014, after Studio 23 reformatted as S+A, Family Rosary Crusade continues to air every Saturday Morning at 5:00 AM.

On November 17, 2018, Family Rosary Crusade aired its last episode on National TV. Due to S+A's daily sports programs, Family Rosary Crusade was no longer to air their episodes and lost its go signal to air. But they are still premiering their episodes through social media on Facebook and YouTube. However, it can be seen on TV Maria and airs the re-runs of the show.

Current programming
On the 21st anniversary of the program incarnation of Family Rosary Crusade on television, long-time guest host Rev. Fr. Erick Santos, of the Archdiocese of Manila and parish priest of the Shrine of the Child Jesus in the poor district of Tondo in Manila joins the FRC program as its main host on March 14, 2010, replacing long-time host Bernard Cañaberal.

The program continues with its magazine type programming with talks and discussions related to themes of the Catholic Church.

Hosts

Current Hosts
Rev. Fr. Allan Samonte - main host 
Chi Datu-Bocobo - segment host for Kwentong Buhay (Life Stories)
Claudine Zialcita - segment host for Dateline FRC
Bernard Factor Cañaberal - segment host for Once Upon a Saint

Former Hosts
Loudette Zaragoza-Banson
Rev. Fr. James Reuter, SJ
Rev. Fr. Larry Faraon, OP
Rev. Fr. Erick Santos
Rev. Fr. Joel Francis Victorino

Segments
Church Alive - a 10-minute segment where guest panelists explain events and issues in the Philippine Catholic church.
Dateline FRC - a world summary of important news & events within and affecting the Catholic Church.
Kwentong Buhay - (Life Stories) short inspirational storytelling of one's spiritual discovery, life-changing work of faith through prayers.
Once Upon A Saint - a fun way of re-telling the life of saints before elementary and high school students.
Sunday Gospel Reflections - reflections and inspirations based on the Sunday gospel as explained by a guest priest.

See also
 Official site of Family Rosary Crusade: Philippines
 Official site of the Holy Cross Family Ministries

References

.

"All For Her: An Autobiography of Father Patrick Peyton, CSC" By Father Patrick Peyton, CSC Family Theater Publications, Hollywood California 90046 Original © 1967, revisions in 1973 & 1997. U.S. Library of Congress Catalog Card Number 67-22441
"Fifty Golden Years of the Family Rosary Crusade in the Philippines (1951-2001)" written by Father James B. Reuter, SJ; Gennie Q. Jota; Dean M. Bernardo, edited by Stella J. Villegas 2001 Family Rosary Crusade Foundation, Inc. © 2001

Television shows about Catholicism
Philippine religious television series
ABS-CBN Sports and Action original programming
ABS-CBN original programming
TV5 (Philippine TV network) original programming
Radio Philippines Network original programming
People's Television Network original programming
1987 Philippine television series debuts
2018 Philippine television series endings
1980s Philippine television series
Filipino-language television shows
English-language television shows